"Cavorting" is the first single by the Manchester indie rock band The Courteeners. The single was released in the United Kingdom on 6 August 2007 as both a CD single and a 7" vinyl. It was the lead single from the band's first album, St. Jude.

Chart performance
"Cavorting" was met with local success on its release on 6 August 2007, debuting on the UK chart at number 192.

It was NME's Single of The Week.

Track listing

Credits
Producer – Tom Knott 
Written by [words and music) – Liam Fray

Charts

Release history

References

2007 singles
The Courteeners songs
2007 songs
Polydor Records singles
Songs written by Liam Fray